The Hoppin Formation named for Hoppin Hill in North Attleborough, Massachusetts, contains Early Cambrian fossils associated with the explosion of multi-cellular life, beginning 539 million years ago at the start of the Phanerozoic Eon. 
The bottom rock units of the formation are arkose quartzite, conglomerate and sandstone. The quartzite lies on top and was sourced from the underlying Dedham Granite. Upper units in the formation include green and red slate shale, calcareous nodules and layers of red, argillite limestone.

The Hoppin Formation contains fossil trilobites, hyolithids and volborthellids. It is capped off by non-fossiliferous red and green slate, 186 meters thick, followed by an angular unconformity with the younger Early Pennsylvanian Pondville Conglomerate. 
In total, a 244-meter thickness of the formation is exposed. In 1969, Boston College geologist, James Skehan, proposed that the unit might be related to the Manuels Brook section in southeastern Newfoundland.

Paleoenvironment
The Hoppin Hill Formation records a marine transgression and a near-shore shelf environment on top of Paleozoic granites and matches up with the Weymouth Formation, near Boston.

Other outcrops
In addition to the namesake exposure at Hoppin Hill, limestone and slate belonging to the formation are exposed beneath a power line, east of Cumberland Street and immediately north of the Rhode Island state line in Wrentham.

References

 
Natural history of Massachusetts